"WE (Warm Embrace)",  also known by the simplified title "Warm Embrace", is a song by American singer and songwriter Chris Brown, released by RCA Records as the second single from his tenth studio album, Breezy, on April 1, 2022.

Composition
"Warm Embrace" is an R&B slow jam that contains an interpolation of Guy's 1991 single "Let's Chill". According to Vibe the "romantic" content of the song "eases away from his recent trajectory of hyper-sexual music" being part of the crooner's "soft side".

Critical reception
Vibe'''s reviewer Mya Abraham praised the track as "endearing", and stating that its sound is reminiscent of ’80s R&B. Keithan Samuels of Rated R&B found the song to be "sweet-sounding". HotNewHipHop'' called the song a "sensual slow jam", and complimented its "clever interpolation".

Music video
The song's accompanying music video was released on June 21, 2022, and featured a cameo by American singer Normani. Additionally, it was directed by Arrad.

Charts

References

2022 singles
2022 songs
Chris Brown songs
Songs written by Chris Brown
Songs written by Keith Sweat
Songs written by Teddy Riley
Songs written by Bernard Belle
RCA Records singles
Hip hop soul songs